The Euro Hockey Tour (EHT) is an annual ice hockey tournament open to only the national men's teams of Czechia, Finland, Switzerland and Sweden. Most of the teams use the competition as a preparation for the upcoming World Championships or Olympics, allowing less experienced players to collect valuable ice time in their national colours.

History

Playing format
Euro Hockey Tour consists of four tournaments:
 Karjala Tournament in Finland
 Swiss Ice Hockey Games in Switzerland, replacing the Channel One Cup in Russia following the 2022 Russian invasion of Ukraine
 Sweden Hockey Games in Sweden
 Czech Hockey Games in Czechia

Each team plays three games in each of the tournaments, giving a total of twelve games per team. After the four tournaments have finished, the teams are seeded according to their respective combined point total from all four tournaments.

In each tournament, five games are played in the host city, and one game in another participating country. For example, in the 2007 edition of Karjala Tournament, the game between Sweden and Russia was played in Jönköping, Sweden, rather than in Finland, who host the Karjala Cup. Every country is assigned one home game and one away game in those games.

Each team is given three points for a regulation-time win, two points for an overtime or shootout win, one point for a loss in overtime or shootout, and zero points for a loss in regulation time. In the four tournaments, if two or more teams end with the same number of points, they are seeded based on head-to-head results in games against the tied teams. In the EHT standings however, two or more teams tied in points are seeded based on the better goal difference.

Prize money
The prize money for the winner of each tournament is €50,000 while the second seed gets €30,000, the third seed gets €25,000, and the fourth seed gets €15,000. The EHT season winner receives another €75,000, the team finishing second gets €30,000, and the team finishing third gets €15,000.

Finals in previous years
Medal games were not played until the 2003–04 season. Before that, place order was determined by the tournament standings. The seasons 2003–04, 2004–05 and 2006–07 used a format where the first-placed and second-placed teams played a home-and-home two-game series for the EHT gold and silver medals, while the third-placed and fourth-placed teams played two games for the bronze. In 2005–06, the championship was determined by a single game played at the home of the first-place team. Since 2007–08, no EHT finals have been played.

Participating teams
Four European teams compete in EHT. Czechia, Finland, and Sweden have participated since the tournament was started in 1996. Switzerland replaced Russia in the spring of 2022 after the Russian team was suspended from participation in international tournaments due to the military invasion of Ukraine

Results

Medal table

References

See also
 Ice Hockey European Championships

 

Sports competition series
1996 establishments in Europe
Recurring sporting events established in 1996
Ice hockey events